Ludwig Semrad (1907 – 12 December 1984) was an Austrian Righteous Among the Nations since 1979.

In 1941, he became head of a Polish cigarette factory, which was confiscated from Jews. There he left the management of the factory Wolkowitz to the Jewish director. He tried to employ as many Jews as possible to protect them from deportation to various Nazi concentration camps.

His wife Wanda Semrad is also an Austrian Righteous Among the Nations.

References

External links
 Austrian Righteous Among the Nations
 Ludwig Semrad – his activity to save Jews' lives during the Holocaust, at Yad Vashem website

Austrian Righteous Among the Nations
1907 births
1984 deaths